Eduard Nunatak is the rocky ridge 2.32 km long in northwest–southeast direction and 1.14 km wide, rising to 683 m on Oscar II Coast in Graham Land, Antarctica. It surmounts Artanes Bay on the east and Vaughan Inlet on the west.

The feature is named after Roman Eduard, boatman at St. Kliment Ohridski base during the 2010/11 and subsequent Bulgarian Antarctic campaigns.

Location

Maps
 Antarctic Digital Database (ADD). Scale 1:250000 topographic map of Antarctica. Scientific Committee on Antarctic Research (SCAR). Since 1993, regularly upgraded and updated

Notes

References
 Eduard Nunatak. SCAR Composite Gazetteer of Antarctica
 Bulgarian Antarctic Gazetteer. Antarctic Place-names Commission. (details in Bulgarian, basic data in English)

External links
 Eduard Nunatak. Adjusted Copernix satellite image

Nunataks of Graham Land
Oscar II Coast
Bulgaria and the Antarctic